Mariental Urban is a constituency in the Hardap region of Namibia. It comprises the city of Mariental and the surrounding area. Mariental Urban had a population of 15,557 in 2011, up from 13,109 in 2001.  the constituency had 10,480 registered voters.

Politics
The 2015 regional elections were won by Nico Herman Mungenga of SWAPO with 2,251 votes. Regina Kuhlman of the Democratic Turnhalle Alliance (DTA) came second with 247 votes, followed by Reginald Poulton of the Rally for Democracy and Progress (RDP, 151 votes). The 2020 regional election was won by Petrus Esterhuizen of the Landless People's Movement (LPM, a new party registered in 2018). He obtained 2,015 votes. Fransina Fredrika Basson (SWAPO) came second with 1,409 votes.

References

External links

Constituencies of Hardap Region
States and territories established in 1992
1992 establishments in Namibia